Pierson is a town in Volusia County, Florida, United States. The population was 1,542 as of the 2020 census.

Pierson bills itself as the "Fern Capital of the World". The town is heavily reliant on agriculture which mainly consists of fern growing. Its ferns are exported worldwide for use in floral arrangements and other decorations.

Geography

Pierson is located at  (29.241713, –81.456594). It is the northwesternmost incorporated town in Volusia County. U.S. Route 17 and County Road 3 (former US 17) pass through the town.

Notable people

 Chipper Jones, Major League Baseball star, and 2018 National Baseball Hall of Fame and Museum  inductee, for the Atlanta Braves

Demographics

As of the 2020 United States census, Pierson had a total population of 1,542 people with 435 households.

The median household income was $52,917.

11.1% of the population had a Bachelor’s Degree or higher.

By age, the population was split as follows: 5.5% were under 5 years, 30.3% were under 18, 69.7% were 18 and over, and 16.4% were 65 and over.

Of the total population, 860 people were white, 38 were black, 16 were American Indian and Alaskan Native, 3 were Asian, and 437 were some other race. There were 188 persons of two or more races.

Town Hall

The Town Hall for Pierson is in the Old Pierson Elementary School built circa 1920.

Population statistics

References

Towns in Volusia County, Florida
Towns in Florida
Populated places on the St. Johns River